Joannette Kruger won the final 7–6, 6–3 against Kyoko Nagatsuka.

Seeds
A champion seed is indicated in bold text while text in italics indicates the round in which that seed was eliminated.

  Helena Suková (first round)
  Julie Halard (second round)
  Inés Gorrochategui (second round)
  Gigi Fernández (semifinals)
  Florencia Labat (semifinals)
  Silvia Farina (quarterfinals)
  Linda Harvey-Wild (second round)
  Kyoko Nagatsuka (final)

Draw

External links
 1995 Puerto Rico Open draw

Puerto Rico Open (tennis)
1995 WTA Tour